USS LST-225 was a  in the United States Navy during World War II.

Construction and career 
LST-225 was laid down on 14 April 1943 at Chicago Bridge and Iron Co., Seneca, Indiana. Launched on 4 September 1943 and commissioned on 2 October 1943.

She was present during the West Loch disaster and she was moored with LST-69, LST-205, LST-274, LST-43, LST-179, LST-353, and LST-39. No crew members were lost aboard the ship during that disaster.

During World War II, LST-225 was assigned to the Asiatic-Pacific theater. She took part in the Battle of Saipan from 17 June to 3 July 1944 and the Battle of Tinian from 24 to 28 July 1944.

The ship participated in the occupation of southern Palau Islands from 6 September to 14 October 1944.

LST-225 was decommissioned on 30 July 1946 and struck from the Navy Register on 28 August later that year.

On 16 December 1947, she was sold for scrap to Learner Company, Oakland, California.

Awards 
LST-225 have earned the following awards:

American Campaign Medal
Asiatic-Pacific Campaign Medal (3 battle stars)
World War II Victory Medal
Navy Occupation Service Medal (with Asia clasp)

Citations

Sources 
 
 
 
 

World War II amphibious warfare vessels of the United States
Ships built in Seneca, Illinois
1943 ships
LST-1-class tank landing ships of the United States Navy